Butterfly is an unincorporated community located in Perry County, Kentucky, United States. Its post office  is closed. It was also named Leonard.

References

Unincorporated communities in Perry County, Kentucky
Unincorporated communities in Kentucky
Coal towns in Kentucky